Mary Oshlag (1942–2021)
was an American bridge player. She was a national champion. Her husband, Richard Oshlag, is also a national champion.

Bridge accomplishments

Wins
 North American Bridge Championships (1)
 Truscott Senior Swiss Teams (1) 2011

Runners-up
 North American Bridge Championships (2)
 Chicago Mixed Board-a-Match (1) 1989 
 Wagar Women's Knockout Teams (1) 1999 
 Australian Bridge Championships (1)
 Australian Women Open Teams (1) 1997 

The Chicago Mixed Board-A-Match is now known as the Freeman Mixed Board-A-Match.

Notes

1942 births
2021 deaths
American contract bridge players